Kibombomene is a rural village located in the Northwestern Province of Zambia, about fifty kilometres east of Solwezi.  Most villagers live just off of the Solwezi-Chingola highway, but others are scattered in small, unorganized regions to the north and south.  The population is not officially determined.

Languages 
The local language of the people of Kibombomene is Kaonde, but there is also a small Lovale-speaking population.  Many of the villagers also understand Bemba and English.

Religion 
Most of the people of Kibombomene are Christian, and attend the Seventh Day Baptist church, the Seventh-day Adventist church, or the Roman Catholic Church.

Education 
Children of Kibombomene attend the Kibombomene Basic School.  They also have the opportunity to improve English at a school built by Same World Same Chance (SWSC), a small Canadian NGO dedicated to capacity development in this one village.  Teenagers and adults also attend the SWSC school to improve English and fulfill requirements for secondary school, using the Zambian curriculum.

Economy 
The village is populated mostly by subsistence farmers; some of the produce is sold.  There are some small shops that cater primarily to the traffic running between Solwezi and Chingola.

Some local labourers find occasional work within the village in construction of houses and huts, furniture and other supplies.  Most supplies that cannot be made locally are purchased from Solwezi, upon arrangement with people travelling there.

Populated places in North-Western Province, Zambia